Bieber is a river of Hesse, Germany. It flows into the Haune northeast of Fulda.

See also
List of rivers of Hesse

References

Rivers of Hesse
East Hesse
Rivers of Germany